Florence Babb (born February 21, 1951) is a Harrington Distinguished Professor at the University of North Carolina, Chapel Hill, Department of Anthropology.

Biography 
Florence Evelyn Babb was born in Goshen, New York, February 21, 1951.

Babb graduated from Tufts University and earned her Ph.D. in 1981 from the University at Buffalo. She taught at Colgate University, and University of Iowa. She was Vada Allen Yeomans Professor of Women's Studies at the University of Florida.

Babb did field work with the Cornell-Peru Project.

Babb has published several books and numerous scientific articles on the topics of gender, sexuality, race and class in changing contexts in Latin America. Her  publications include "After revolution: Mapping Gender and Cultural Politics in Neoliberal Nicaragua"  and "The Tourism Encounter: Fashioning Latin American Nations and Histories".

Works 
 Between Field and Cooking Pot: The Political Economy of Marketwomen in Peru, Revised Edition (1998).
 After Revolution: Mapping Gender and Cultural Politics in Neoliberal Nicaragua (2001)

References

External links 
 Curriculum Vitae (CV) Florence E. Babb

1951 births
University of North Carolina at Chapel Hill faculty
Tufts University alumni
Living people
People from Goshen, New York
Colgate University faculty
University of Iowa faculty
Academic staff of the University of Florence